Great Lakes Transportation LLC is a group of transportation related companies primarily consisting of rail and water carriers catering to the needs of the steel making industry centered on the Great Lakes of North America.  GLT companies include:

 Bessemer and Lake Erie Railroad
 Duluth, Missabe and Iron Range Railway
 Great Lakes Fleet
 Pittsburgh & Conneaut Dock Company

Formerly owned by the privately owned Transtar, Inc., GLT's rail and marine holdings were purchased in 2004 by the Canadian National Railway for $380 million USD.

Great Lakes Fleet operates eight Great Lakes bulk carriers ranging from 1,004 feet long to 767 feet long.  Among its carriers is the SS Arthur M. Anderson, notable for being the last ship to have radio contact with her sister ship the SS Edmund Fitzgerald and would be the lead ship to attempt to rescue her crew.

United States railroad holding companies
Transportation companies of the United States
Canadian National Railway subsidiaries